Rauno Heinla (born 7 June 1982) is an Estonian professional strongman competitor. He is a specialist in the deadlift events and is regarded as one of the best deadlifters in the world.

Strongman career
Born in Tartu, Estonia, Rauno started his Strongman career 2000 in local strongman competition Kõrveküla rammumees, first national title was by winning the Estonia's strongest Man competition in 2008. He's the only Estonian to win this title 6 times following the footsteps of Tarmo Mitt and Andrus Murumets (both who won 5 times each). For most of his career, Rauno trained with fellow Estonian Strongman Lauri Nämi.

Rauno identifies heavy stones and deadlift for reps as his favourite events, and also recognizes that he needs to improve his truck pulls and super yokes.  

In his career spanning across 22 years, Rauno has competed over 45 international competitions and 8 single event contests. On September 13, 2020, Rauno broke the 400 kg Deadlift (standard bar) for repetitions world record with 6 reps under World's Ultimate Strongman Feats of Strength series. Along with Hafþór Júlíus Björnsson and Eddie Hall, Rauno is also one of only a handful of men who has Deadlifted 1,000 lbs (453.5 kg) or more, quite a few times. He has done it both in conventional and sumo variations.

Personal records
Deadlift (for Reps) –  x 6 reps (World's Ultimate Strongman) (Feats of Strength series, 2020) (World Record) Rauno has also done this twice more during training. 
Deadlift (Max.) –  (Conventional) (Masters World Record)
Deadlift (Max.) –  (Sumo)
Squat –  Raw,   x 10 reps
Bench press –  Raw
Log press –  ,  x 4 reps
Axle press –  x 2 reps
Atlas Stones – 5 stone set in 21.20 seconds
 Silver Dollar Deadlift -  (World Record)

References

External links

1982 births
Estonian strength athletes
Sportspeople from Tartu
Living people